The term national instrument can refer to:

National instrument (music), of particular cultural and social importance
National Instrument 43-101, a national instrument for the Standards of Disclosure for Mineral Projects within Canada
National Instruments, an American corporation